Syd Jenkins (fl. 1900s) was a Welsh professional rugby league footballer who played in the 1900s.

International honours
Syd Jenkins played right-, i.e. number 2, for Welsh League XIII in the 14-13 victory over Australia at Penydarren Park, Merthyr Tydfil on Tuesday 19 January 1909.

References

Notes

External links

Place of birth missing
Place of death missing
Rugby league wingers
Welsh League rugby league team players
Welsh rugby league players
Year of birth missing
Year of death missing